Oleksiy Fedosiyovych Vatchenko (25 February 1914 – 22 November 1984) was a Ukrainian and Soviet politician, who served as the chairman of Presidium of the Supreme Council of the Ukrainian Soviet Socialist Republic from 1976 to 1984.

Biography
Oleksiy Vatchenko was born in a village of Yelizaveto-Kamyanets that today is located in Dnipropetrovsk, Eastern Ukraine. His sister was Horpyna Vatchenko, director of the Dmytro Yavornytsky National Historical Museum of Dnipro.

References

External links
Profile in the Handbook on history of the Communist Party and the Soviet Union 1898–1991

1914 births
1984 deaths
Politicians from Dnipro
People from Yekaterinoslav Governorate
Ukrainian people in the Russian Empire
Central Committee of the Communist Party of the Soviet Union members
Politburo of the Central Committee of the Communist Party of Ukraine (Soviet Union) members
Sixth convocation members of the Soviet of Nationalities
Seventh convocation members of the Soviet of the Union
Eighth convocation members of the Soviet of the Union
Ninth convocation members of the Soviet of the Union
Tenth convocation members of the Soviet of the Union
Eleventh convocation members of the Soviet of the Union
Communist Party of Ukraine (Soviet Union) politicians
Head of Presidium of the Verkhovna Rada of the Ukrainian Soviet Socialist Republic
Governors of Dnipropetrovsk Oblast
Heroes of Socialist Labour
Recipients of the Order of Lenin
Recipients of the Order of the Red Banner
Recipients of the Order of Alexander Nevsky
21st-century Ukrainian politicians